is a Japanese speed skater who is specialized in the sprint distances.

Career 
Haga competed in the 1000m event at the 2010 Winter Olympics in Vancouver and finished in 29th place.

At the first competition weekend of the 2018–19 ISU Speed Skating World Cup in Obihiro, Japan in March he finished second in the second 500m event.

Personal records

References

External links
 ISU biography
 Olympics profile
 SpeedSaktingNews profile

1988 births
Living people
Japanese male speed skaters
Speed skaters at the 2010 Winter Olympics
Olympic speed skaters of Japan
People from Obihiro, Hokkaido